David Hosking  nicknamed "The Mule" is an Australian former professional rugby league footballer who played in the 1980s and 1990s. He played for South Sydney and Manly-Warringah in the NSWRL competition. He also played for Hull Kingston Rovers in England.

Playing career
Hosking made his first grade debut for South Sydney in round 2 of the 1987 NSWRL season against St. George. In 1989, Hosking made five appearances for Souths as they claimed the Minor Premiership. Hosking departed Souths at the end of the season having made over 60 appearances for the club across all grades. In 1990, Hosking joined Manly where he played 63 games for the club over four years. Hosking featured in Manly's 1990 and 1991 finals campaigns. In 1993, Hosking signed for English club Hull Kingston Rovers where he played one season.

References

1964 births
Manly Warringah Sea Eagles players
Hull Kingston Rovers players
South Sydney Rabbitohs players
Australian rugby league players
Rugby league props
Living people